David Humanes Muñoz (born 13 November 1996), commonly known as David Bollo, is a Spanish professional footballer who last played as a defender for Armenian club Ararat-Armenia.

Career

Club
On 5 August 2020, Armenian champions Ararat-Armenia announced the signing of Bollo. On 3 June 2021, Bollo left Ararat-Armenia after his contract expired.

Career statistics

Club

References

1996 births
Living people
Spanish footballers
Association football defenders
First Professional Football League (Bulgaria) players
PFC Slavia Sofia players
FC Ararat-Armenia players
Spanish expatriate footballers
Expatriate footballers in Bulgaria
Expatriate footballers in Armenia
Spanish expatriate sportspeople in Bulgaria